Val-du-Faby is a commune in the Aude department in southern France. The municipality was established on 1 January 2019 by merger of the former communes of Fa and Rouvenac.

See also
Communes of the Aude department

References

Communes of Aude

Communes nouvelles of Aude
Populated places established in 2019
2019 establishments in France